Cleyton Coelho dos Santos (born May 12, 1988), known as Boka, is a Brazilian football player.

Career
Boka played J2 League club Thespakusatsu Gunma in 2016.

References

External links

1988 births
Living people
Brazilian footballers
Brazilian expatriate footballers
J2 League players
Giresunspor footballers
Vasas SC players
Thespakusatsu Gunma players
Expatriate footballers in Turkey
Expatriate footballers in Hungary
Expatriate footballers in Japan
Association football forwards